The Ministry of Culture of Brazil was a ministry of the Brazilian government, created on March 15, 1985 by the president José Sarney and extinct on May 12, 2016 by Michel Temer. Before 1985, the duties of the ministry were of authority of the Ministry of Education, which from 1953 to 1985 was called the Ministry of Education and Culture (MEC). Ministry of Culture was responsible for the letters, arts, folklore and other forms of expression of national culture and for the historical, archaeological, artistic and cultural heritage of Brazil. After being extinct, their function was incorporated into the Ministry of Education again.

There were 17 Ministers of Culture. The first was José Aparecido de Oliveira, and the last, Margareth Menezes.

List of Ministers

See also

Federal institutions of Brazil

References

External links

 
Brazil culture-related lists
Brazil politics-related lists